2wo Third3 (pronounced "two thirds") were a gay four piece 1990s electropop group, with three performing members and one non-performing songwriting member. They were called 2wo Third3 because out of the performing members, the two backing members dressed in identical clothing usually with rubber gloves and the frontman, Lee, did not. He usually wore a trademark 2wo Third3 plaster on his face (this being pre-Nelly). The fourth member was represented by a cartoon character called Biff, who appeared in the band's promotional material and record covers.

The band were managed by East 17/ Bros manager Tom Watkins and signed to Sony Music UK's Epic Records label. The design aspect of the band was very important, with customised yellow rubber gloves being sent out with promotional records, and a free Biff plaster being issued to fans.

The band supported East 17 on their "Around the World" tour in 1994.

In 2007 Lee (a.k.a. 4th child), was signed by Hit! Records, and recorded a new version of "Now I Found You" in March of that year.

Biff
Richard "Biff" Stannard went on to become a songwriter for many other bands such as 5ive and Spice Girls.

Singles
 "Hear Me Calling" (Epic Records/Sony Music - 1994) - UK No. 48
 "Ease the Pressure" (Epic Records/Sony Music - 1994) - UK No. 45
 "I Want the World" (Epic Records/Sony Music - 1994) - UK No. 20
 "I Want to Be Alone" (Epic Records/Sony Music - 1995) - UK No. 29

References

External links
 More about the group

British synth-pop groups
British techno music groups
LGBT-themed musical groups